YPS may refer to:

 Civil Protection Units (YPS), a Kurdish rebel group in Turkey
 IATA airport code of Port Hawkesbury Airport, in Canada
 Yps (comics), a German comic
 Yellow prussiate of soda, or sodium ferrocyanide
 the Yorkshire Philosophical Society (founded 1822)